Vukovec is a village in Croatia. It is connected by the D22 highway.

References

Populated places in Koprivnica-Križevci County